Lobophyllia rowleyensis is a species of large polyp stony corals.  The coral has a number of different color variations with the largest variety found in the northern part of its range near Indonesia.

References 

Lobophylliidae